Bethune "Siot" Tanquingcen is a Filipino professional basketball head coach. He is currently an assistant coach for the  Benilde Blazers.

As coach, Tanquingcen has won three PBA championships: two with Barangay Ginebra San Miguel (2004 Fiesta Conference and 2004–2005 Philippine Cup) and one with the San Miguel Beermen (2009 Fiesta Conference).

He was former player for the UST Growling Tigers in the UAAP, the Sunkist Orange Juicers and the San Miguel Beermen in the PBA and the Pampanga Dragons in the Metropolitan Basketball Association. He finished high school at the Philippine Cultural High School.

Playing career
Tanquingcen was one of the role players for the UST Tigers in their historic four-peat run from 1993 to 1996 under head coach Aric del Rosario. Other members of the said squad were Chris Cantonjos, Estong Ballesteros, Rey Evangelista, Dennis Espino and Bal David.

He also played as the starting point guard for the Philippine team, alongside Poch Juinio that won the gold medal in the 1993 Southeast Asian Games.

He went undrafted in the PBA draft in 1996, but was signed by Sunkist late in the season. He got to play for a total of three games as a practice player.

He also played for the San Miguel Beermen from 1997 to 1998 as a 12th man for the team. In 1999, he joined his former UST mentor del Rosario in the MBA's Pampanga Dragons, usually as its starting point guard.

Coaching career

San Miguel under Jong Uichico
After his stint with the Dragons, Tanquingcen became the assistant coach of the San Miguel Beermen under Jong Uichico. In 2002, Tanquingcen was the team's interim coach with Uichico tasked to lead the Philippine national basketball team in the 2002 Asian Games. Despite a limited lineup of Dorian Peña, Boybits Victoria and imports Lamont Strothers, Art Long, Shea Seals and Terquin Mott, he coached the Beermen to a respectable fourth-place finish in the Governor's Cup and finished third in the Commissioner's Cup.

Barangay Ginebra Kings as head coach: 2004–2006
Tanquingcen would return to his assistant duties for the next two seasons. However, midway through the 2004 PBA Fiesta Conference, Barangay Ginebra mentor Allan Caidic was relegated as team manager and hired Tanquincen from its sister team as its new head coach.

The change led to changes in the Ginebra system, as Tanquingcen used more of Jayjay Helterbrand on the point guard spot instead of the inconsistent and injured Bal David. This and other changes led to the Kings' improbable championship in the said conference, defeating Red Bull Barako, 3–1.

In the 2004–05 Philippine Cup, Tanquingcen once again led the crowd-favorites to its first back-to-back title in franchise history after defeating the Talk 'N Text Phone Pals in six games.

2006–07 Philippine Cup: Demotion and Move to Interim Coach
During the 2006 offseason, Jong Uichico was named as the new head coach of the Barangay Ginebra Kings, after a big overhaul by almost all of the then-four PBA teams of San Miguel Corporation (the Coca-Cola Tigers is now under the Coca-Cola Company). Tanquingcen, however, was demoted as Uichico's assistant, reprising the role he had with the Beermen.

Despite the limited role, Tanquingcen was normally spotted mapping out offensive sets for the Kings during timeouts as Uichico looks on. The Kings would eventually won the Philippine Cup as an assistant defeating sister company, the Beermen after winning the last four games following a 0–2 hole.

2007: San Miguel's coach
In the 2007 PBA Fiesta Conference, Tanquingcen was sent back to San Miguel as an interim coach for Chot Reyes, who focused his role as head of the Philippine national basketball team. At the time Tanquingcen was named head coach, San Miguel struggled with a 0–6 record, and eventually posted a 1–7 card.

But, the Beermen began a surprise run in the tournament, that began with an eight-game winning streak, before finishing with a 10–8 record, and a wild-card appearance.

In a wildcard match against the Coca-Cola Tigers for the final quarterfinals berth, San Miguel won a 102–101 miracle score despite trailing by four points with only 13 seconds left.

Their run continued in the quarterfinals, scoring an upset against his former team, Barangay Ginebra, in the best-of-three series before falling to eventual champion Alaska Aces in a grueling six-game tussle. In 2009 PBA Fiesta Conference they defeat the crowd favorite Barangay Ginebra Kings in seven games 90–79 to get his third PBA title as a head coach.

2010: Back to Ginebra as assistant

SMC made its announcement in August 2010 that Ato Agustin will be the new head coach of the San Miguel Beermen beginning 2010–11 season. Siot Tanquincen has been transferred back to the Barangay Ginebra Kings as assistant to Jong Uichico.

2011/2012: Ginebra as head coach

SMC management once again decided to relegate Siot Tanquincen as the head tactician of the Barangay Ginebra Kings together with Jong Uichico. They were both head coaches but Siot having the last call for the team. After one conference Jong Uichico then decided to move to Pangilinan owned Meralco team as a consultant right after being considered to be part of Smart Gilas coaching staff. At the start of the second conference Siot becomes the lone coach of the country's most popular team with Allan Caidic, Marco Januz Sauler and Art dela Cruz as assistants.

2014: Barako Bull Energy

Tanquincen took over the coaching duties of Barako Bull from Bong Ramos after a dismal 2–7 win–loss campaign in the 2014 PBA Commissioner's Cup. In his first conference with Barako during the Governors' Cup, his team barely squeaked in the quarterfinals with 3–6 win–loss record, and was eliminated by Talk 'N Text.

He was fired before the start of the new season due to conflicts with management.  He was replaced by Koy Banal.

2015–2018: Consulting and assisting in the collegiate ranks 

Tanquingcen was appointed as one of the assistant coaches of the De La Salle Green Archers since May 2015. in 2018, he relocated to Benilde Blazers, as consultant and assistant coach.

Coaching record

PBA

See also
 Barangay Ginebra Kings
 UST Growling Tigers men's basketball

References

Hardcourt: The Official Philippine Basketball Association Annual

External links
 PBA.ph

1972 births
Living people
Basketball players from Metro Manila
Filipino men's basketball coaches
Filipino men's basketball players
Filipino people of Chinese descent
San Miguel Beermen coaches
Philippines men's national basketball team players
Point guards
Pop Cola Panthers players
San Miguel Beermen players
UST Growling Tigers basketball players
Barangay Ginebra San Miguel coaches
Barako Bull Energy coaches
De La Salle Green Archers basketball coaches
Benilde Blazers basketball coaches